Clyde Miller may refer to:

 Clyde Miller (Washington politician), member of the Washington House of Representatives
 Clyde L. Miller, Lieutenant Governor of Utah
 Clyde R. Miller, professor of education

See also
 Clyde C. Miller Career Academy, a public high school in St. Louis, Missouri